The 2014 Inter-Provincial Cup is the second season of the Inter-Provincial Cup, the domestic List A cricket competition of Ireland. The competition is played between Leinster Lightning, Northern Knights and North-West Warriors.

The Leinster Lightning won this year's competition with a game to spare, after beating the Northern Knights at Waringstown.  In the final match of the season, at Rathmines against the same opposition, the Lightning won again to finish the competition with a 100% record of four wins out of four.

The Inter-Provincial Series has been funded at least partly by the ICC via their TAPP programme.

Final Table

Squads

Fixtures
The tournament ran from 3 May to 20 September.

References

See also
2014 Inter-Provincial Championship
2014 Inter-Provincial Trophy
2014 Irish cricket season

Inter
Inter-Provincial Cup seasons